The League of the Macedonians (Koinòn tōn Makedónōn) was a confederationally-organized commonwealth institution (i.e., an ancient Greek regional state or koinon) consisting of all Macedonian communities united around a monarch. It can be paralleled from the koinon of the Molossians, but it seems that the Macedonian koinon had far less power than that of the Molossians. The capital, or headquarters, of the Macedonian koinon was the city of Beroia.

History
Both numismatic and inscriptional evidence attest to the existence of the Macedonian koinon before and after the Roman conquest of Macedon. Coinage in the name of the "Macedonians" (i.e., ΜΑΚΕΔΟΝΩΝ) was in continuous production from the reigns of Philip V (r. 238–179 BC) and Perseus (r. 212–166 BC) well into the Roman period. It was reorganized under the early Roman Empire and transformed into an institution related to the imperial cult as happened to all the koina of the period.

The koinon, administered by local elite members, organized and financed games and festivals and were awarded Roman citizenship. Using traditional ethnic symbols depicted on its coins, such as the Macedonian shield and the winged thunderbolt, the koinon preserved a sense of Greek/Macedonian civic identity within the province until the end of the 2nd century AD. The last attestation of a person "ethnically" identified as Macedonian is dated to the beginning of the 4th century AD.

References

Citations

Sources

 

Government of Macedonia (ancient kingdom)
Antigonid Macedonia
Government of Roman Macedonia
Macedonian